The 1917 Campeonato Paulista, organized by the APEA (Associação Paulista de Esportes Atléticos), was the 16th season of São Paulo's top association football league. Paulistano won the title for the 5th time. the top scorer was Ypiranga's Arthur Friedenreich with 15 goals.

System
The championship was disputed in a double-round robin system, with the team with the most points winning the title.

Championship

References

Campeonato Paulista seasons
Paulista